Eremoceras is a genus in the Ellesmeroceratidae which lived during the Early Ordovician, characterized by an orthoconic adult stage, similar to Ellesmeroceras, but with the dorsal side of the adult living chamber somewhat convex, and a juvenile portion that is more gradually expanding and ventrally concave. The siphuncle is ventral, partitioned by diaphragms as typical for the family. Siphuncle segments have short septal necks and thick connecting rings.

References
Rousseu H Flower, 1964.  The Nautiloid Order Ellesmeroceratida (Cephalopoda) New Mexico Bureau of Mines and Mineral Resources Memoir 12.

Ellesmerocerida